Lisa Ann Walter (born August 3, 1963) is an American actress, comedian and television producer, best known for her roles as Chessy in the romantic comedy film The Parent Trap and Melissa Schemmenti on the ABC mockumentary sitcom Abbott Elementary. 

She was formerly the creator and executive producer of Oxygen network reality weight-loss competition series, Dance Your Ass Off. Her other reality television work includes her stint as a judge on ABC's reality television series The Next Best Thing: Who Is the Greatest Celebrity Impersonator?, and as winning a celebrity edition of the game show The Weakest Link. She also created and starred in the short-lived 1996–1997 sitcom, Life's Work, and appeared in Bruce Almighty, Shall We Dance, and War of the Worlds.

Early life
Walter was born on August 3, 1963, in Silver Spring, Maryland. She and her older sister, Laura, are the children of a geophysicist British father who was born in France of Alsatian descent and a substitute-teacher mother who was born in Sicily. The family lived in different places following their father's work, and their childhood homes included Germany and the suburbs of Washington, D.C.  She graduated with a theater degree from Catholic University of America in Washington, D.C., in 1983.

Career
After five years of standup comedy, Walter was cast to star in her own Fox Network comedy series, My Wildest Dreams, followed by an ABC sitcom, Life's Work, which she both created and starred in. Walter also co-starred in the Bravo series Breaking News and in the NBC sitcom Emeril.

In addition to Bruce Almighty (2003) and Shall We Dance (2004), Walter co-starred in the Disney film The Parent Trap (1998); in the remake of the original classic, she appeared as Chessy, the nanny to Dennis Quaid's character's daughter, who was played by a young Lindsay Lohan. Prior to that, she played Whoopi Goldberg's tarty sidekick Claudine in Eddie (1996).

In early 2007, Walter had a supporting role as Mabel the bartender in the MyNetworkTV soap opera Watch Over Me. Later that May she served as a judge on the ABC reality TV show The Next Best Thing, which searched for the best celebrity impersonators in America. In early 2008, Walter was in the comedy film Drillbit Taylor, and also starred on the VH1 reality series Celebracadabra, in which celebrities competed to see who was the best magician among them. She made it to the final three but was eliminated in the sixth episode. She has developed a series for the Oxygen network called Dance Your Ass Off. On December 19, 2011, she appeared on Rizzoli & Isles as a ballet coach, J.J. It was far from her usual role, as she played a very serious character in a drama.

Her comic memoir, The Best Thing About My Ass Is That It's Behind Me, was published in May 2011.

Beginning in May 2011, Walter hosted The Fabulous Lisa Ann Walter Show, a talk show on the Los Angeles radio station KFI. The program aired for three hours each Saturday and Sunday. In August 2014, Walter quit in order to focus on her acting career.

Since 2021, Walter appears in the ABC comedy Abbott Elementary as second grade teacher Melissa Schemmenti. Walter, alongside the rest of the show's cast, won the Screen Actors Guild Award for Outstanding Performance by an Ensemble in a Comedy Series at the 2023 ceremony.

On October 20, 2022, Walter received the Virtuoso Award at the San Diego International Film Festival.

Filmography

Film

Television

References

External links 

1963 births
Actresses from Maryland
American television actresses
American people of German descent
American people of Italian descent
Living people
People from Silver Spring, Maryland
Catholic University of America alumni
American film actresses
American women comedians
21st-century American women
20th-century American actresses
21st-century American actresses